Shai Kakon (born 5 November 2002) is an Israeli sailor. She competes for Israel at the 2020 Summer Olympics.

2020 Tokyo Summer Olympics
Kakon represented Israel at the 2020 Summer Olympics, competing in Laser Radial and placing 30th overall and therefore missing the final round. She placed fifth at the 10th race.

References

External links
 

2002 births
Israeli female sailors (sport)
Israeli Jews
Living people
Olympic sailors of Israel
People from Hadera
Sailors at the 2020 Summer Olympics – Laser Radial